Smithers/Tyhee Lake Water Aerodrome  is located adjacent to Smithers, British Columbia, Canada.

See also
Smithers Airport

References

Seaplane bases in British Columbia
Smithers, British Columbia
Registered aerodromes in British Columbia